An autoimmune disease is a condition arising from an abnormal immune response to a functioning body part. At least 80 types of autoimmune diseases have been identified, with some evidence suggesting that there may be more than 100 types. Nearly any body part can be involved. Common symptoms can be diverse and transient, ranging from mild to severe, and generally include low grade fever and feeling tired. 

The cause is unknown. Some autoimmune diseases such as lupus run in families, and certain cases may be triggered by infections or other environmental factors. Some common diseases that are generally considered autoimmune include celiac disease, diabetes mellitus type 1, graves' disease, inflammatory bowel disease, multiple sclerosis, alopecia areata, addison’s disease, pernicious anemia, psoriasis, rheumatoid arthritis, and systemic lupus erythematosus. The diagnosis can be difficult to determine.

Treatment depends on the type and severity of the condition. Nonsteroidal anti-inflammatory drugs (NSAIDs) and immunosuppressants are often used. Intravenous immunoglobulin may also occasionally be used. While treatment usually improves symptoms, they do not typically cure the disease.

About 24 million (~7.5%) people in the United States are affected by an autoimmune disease. Women are more commonly affected than men. Often they start during adulthood. The first autoimmune diseases were described in the early 1900s.

Signs and symptoms 

Certain autoimmune diseases present similar symptoms across the more than eighty types. Others do not; type 1 diabetes, for example, is relatively distinct from rheumatoid arthritis. The presence and severity of these signs and symptoms depend on the location and type of autoimmune response that occurs. A person may have more than one autoimmune disease simultaneously and display symptoms of each. Signs and symptoms presented, and the disease itself, can depend on age, hormones, environment, and other factors. In general, the common symptoms are
 fatigue
 low fever
 generally feeling unwell (malaise)
 muscle aches and joint pain
 rash.

The appearance of these signs and symptoms can fluctuate; their reappearance is called flare-up. Such signs and symptoms may aid in diagnosis by supporting the results from tests for biologic markers of autoimmune diseases.

There are several areas that are commonly affected by autoimmune diseases, including blood vessels, underlying connective tissues, joints and muscles, red blood cells, skin, and endocrine glands (such as the thyroid gland and the pancreas).

These diseases tend to have pathological effects that characterize them as autoimmune diseases, including damage to tissues where there is an abnormal immune response, altered organ growth, and altered organ function, depending on the location of the disease. Some diseases affect only certain organs and tissues; others are systemic, affecting many tissues throughout the body. Signs and symptoms may vary, depending on the category of disease.

Cancer 
Research suggests an overall correlation between autoimmune diseases and cancer, in that having an autoimmune disease increases the risk of developing certain cancers. Autoimmune diseases cause inflammation in various ways, but the particular cause of inflammation does not greatly affect cancer risk. Rather, the cancer risk depends largely on the fact that all autoimmune diseases increase chronic inflammation, which has been linked to cancer. Below are some autoimmune diseases most commonly linked to cancer, including celiac disease, inflammatory bowel disease (Crohn's disease and ulcerative colitis), multiple sclerosis, rheumatoid arthritis, and systemic lupus erythematosus.

Examples 
Following are a few examples of autoimmune diseases. See List of autoimmune diseases for a more exhaustive list.

Coeliac disease 
Coeliac disease presents the strongest associations to gastrointestinal and lymphoproliferative cancers. In coeliac disease, the autoimmune reaction is caused by the body's loss of immune tolerance to ingested gluten, found primarily in wheat, barley, and rye. This explains the increased risk of gastrointestinal cancers, as the gastrointestinal tract includes the esophagus, stomach, small intestine, large intestine, rectum, and anus, all areas that the ingested gluten would traverse in digestion. The incidence of gastrointestinal cancer can be partially reduced or eliminated if a patient removes gluten from their diet. Additionally, celiac disease is correlated with lymphoproliferative cancers.

Inflammatory bowel disease 
Inflammatory bowel disease (IBD) is associated with cancers of the gastrointestinal tract and some lymphoproliferative cancers. IBD can be further categorized as Crohn's disease or ulcerative colitis. In both cases, individuals with IBD lose immune tolerance for normal bacteria present in the gut microbiome. In this case, the immune system attacks the bacteria and induces chronic inflammation, which has been linked to increased cancer risk.

Multiple sclerosis 
Multiple sclerosis is associated with decreased risk of cancer overall but an increased risk of central nervous system cancer, primarily in the brain. Multiple sclerosis is a neurodegenerative disease in which T-cells – a specific type of immune cells – attack the important myelin sheath in brain neurons. This reduces the nervous system function, creating inflammation and subsequent cancer of the brain.

Rheumatoid arthritis 
Rheumatoid arthritis presents mild, yet significant associations with focal cancers all throughout the body as well as lymphoproliferative cancers. In rheumatoid arthritis, cells that make up the body's joints and cartilages become invasive and induce local inflammation. Additionally, the chronic inflammation and over-activation of the immune system creates an environment that favors further malignant transformation of other cells. This can explain the associations to cancer of the lungs and skin as well as the increased risk of other hematologic cancers none of which are directly affected by the inflammation of joints.

Systemic lupus erythematosus 
Systemic lupus erythematosus is associated with focal cancers throughout the body and lymphoproliferative cancers. Systemic lupus erythematosus affects multiple organ systems and is characterized by a widespread loss of immune tolerance. The chronic inflammation throughout the entire body promotes the malignant transformation of other cells which contributes to the increased risk of systemic and lymphoproliferative cancers. Conversely, systemic lupus erythematosus is correlated with a decrease in some cancers. This is best explained by increased immunosurveillance in these areas, however, the mechanism for why these areas experience lower incidence is poorly understood.

Aplastic anemia 
In aplastic anemia the body fails to produce blood cells in sufficient numbers. Blood cells are produced in the bone marrow by stem cells that reside there. Aplastic anaemia causes a deficiency of all blood cell types: red blood cells, white blood cells and platelets.

Causes 
The cause is unknown. Some autoimmune diseases such as lupus run in families, and certain cases may be triggered by infections or other environmental factors. There are more than 100 autoimmune diseases. Some common diseases that are generally considered autoimmune include celiac disease, diabetes mellitus type 1, Graves' disease, inflammatory bowel disease, multiple sclerosis, psoriasis, rheumatoid arthritis, and systemic lupus erythematosus.

Genetics 
Autoimmune diseases are conditions in which the human immune system attacks healthy human tissues within the body. The exact genes responsible for causing each autoimmune disease have not been found. However, several experimental methods such as the genome-wide association scans have been used to identify certain genetic risk variants that may or may not be responsible. Research focusing on both genome scanning and family trait inheritance analysis has enabled scientists to further understand the etiology of autoimmune diseases such as Type 1 diabetes and Rheumatoid arthritis.
 Type 1 diabetes is a condition in which pancreatic β-cells are targeted and destroyed by the immune system. The condition is a result of neo-natal mutations to the insulin gene (INS) which is responsible for mediating the production of the insulin in the pancreas. The INS gene is located on the short arm of chromosome 11p15.5 in between the genes for tyrosine hydroxylase and insulin-like growth factor II. In addition to chromosome 11, a genetic determinant of type 1 diabetes is a locus called the major histocompatibility complex (MHC) located on chromosome 6p21.
 Rheumatoid arthritis: Although there is no complete genetic mapping for this condition, several genes are thought to play a role in causing RA. The genes that influence the human immune system contain a TNF receptor associated factor 1(TRAF1). This TRAF1 is located on chromosome 9q33-34. In addition, B1 genes in the human genome contain an increased concentration of HLA-DRB1 alleles that are most commonly seen in RA patients. RA can vary in severity as a consequence of polymorphisms within the genome.

Environmental factors 
A range of environmental factors have been recognized as either having a direct role in development, or being a catalyst to many autoimmune diseases. Current studies "indicate" up to seventy percent of autoimmune disease are perhaps due to environmental factors, including: chemicals, infection, diet, and gut dysbiosis. A single set of steps has been identified to be the most likely theory for autoimmune disease onset still there is of yet no definitive proof.

 Environmental triggers
 Reduced oral tolerance
 Gut dysbiosis
 Enhanced gut permeability
 Increased immune reactivity
 Autoimmunity

Chemicals can be found within the direct environment or in the form of drugs, including: hydrazines, hair dyes, trichloroethylene, tartrazines, hazardous wastes, and industrial emissions.

UV radiation is found to be a possible cause of development of the autoimmune disease dermatomyositis, exposure to pesticides plays a role in rheumatoid arthritis development, and vitamin D has been found to be a key in preventing immune dysfunctions in older populations. Infectious agents are considered T cell activators, a step needed for activation of autoimmune diseases. These mechanisms are relatively unknown, but are one of the current alternative theories to explain autoimmune diseases triggered by infection such as Guillain-Barre syndrome and rheumatic fever.

Pathophysiology
The human immune system typically produces both T cells and B cells that are capable of being reactive with self-protein, but these self-reactive cells are usually either killed prior to becoming active within the immune system, placed into a state of anergy (silently removed from their role within the immune system due to over-activation), or removed from their role within the immune system by regulatory cells. When any one of these mechanisms fail, it is possible to have a reservoir of self-reactive cells that become functional within the immune system. The mechanisms of preventing self-reactive T cells from being created take place through negative selection process within the thymus as the T cell is developing into a mature immune cell.

Some infections, such as Campylobacter jejuni, have antigens that are similar (but not identical) to our own self-molecules. In this case, a normal immune response to C. jejuni can result in the production of antibodies that also react to a lesser degree with gangliosides of myelin sheath surrounding peripheral nerves' axons (i.e., Guillain–Barré). A major understanding of the underlying pathophysiology of autoimmune diseases has been the application of genome-wide association scans that have identified a degree of genetic sharing among the autoimmune diseases.

Autoimmunity, on the other hand, is the presence of self-reactive immune response (e.g., auto-antibodies, self-reactive T cells), with or without damage or pathology resulting from it. For this reason, autoantibodies are a hallmark of most autoimmune disorders. This may be restricted to certain organs (e.g. in autoimmune thyroiditis) or involve a particular tissue in different places (e.g. Goodpasture's disease which may affect the basement membrane in both the lung and the kidney).

There are many different theories as to how an autoimmune disease state arises. Some common ones are listed below.

Diagnosis
For a disease to be regarded as an autoimmune disease it needs to answer to Witebsky's postulates (first formulated by Ernest Witebsky and colleagues in 1957 and modified in 1994):
 Direct evidence from transfer of disease-causing antibody or disease-causing T lymphocyte white blood cells
 Indirect evidence based on reproduction of the autoimmune disease in experimental animals
 Circumstantial evidence from clinical clues

Symptoms of early autoimmune disease are often the exact same as common illnesses, including: fatigue, fever, malaise, joint pain, and rash. Due to the fact symptoms vary for affected location, disease causing agents, and individuals, it is difficult for proper diagnosis. Typically, diagnosis begins with looking into a patient's family's history for genetic predisposition. This is combined with various tests, as no single test can identify an autoimmune disease.

Antinuclear antibody 

A test used to identify abnormal proteins, known as antinuclear antibodies, produced when the body attacks its own tissues. It may test positive in several disorders. This test is most useful for diagnosing systemic lupus erythematosus, having a 95% positive test rate.

Complete blood count 
A test taking measurements on maturity levels, count, and size of blood cells. Targeted cells include: red blood cells, white blood cells, hemoglobin, hematocrit, and platelets. Based on increased or decreased numbers in these counts, underlying medical conditions may be present; typically, autoimmune disease is represented by low white blood cell count (Leukopenia). For proper diagnosis, further testing is needed.

Complement 
A test used to measure levels of a protein group of the immune system called complement within blood. If complement is found in low levels, this may be an indication of disease.

C-reactive protein 
C-reactive protein, a protein made in the liver, generally increases with inflammation, and may be high in autoimmune disease.

Erythrocyte sedimentation rate 

This test measures the rate at which a patient's blood cells descend in a test tube. More rapid descents may indicate inflammation, a common symptom of autoimmune disease.

If these tests are indicative antibody abnormalities and inflammation, further tests will be conducted to identify the autoimmune disease present.

Treatment 
Treatment depends on the type and severity of the condition. The majority of the autoimmune diseases are chronic and there is no definitive cure, but symptoms can be alleviated and controlled with treatment. 
Standard treatment methods include:
 Vitamin or hormone supplements for what the body is lacking due to the disease (insulin, vitamin B12, thyroid hormone, etc.)
 Blood transfusions if the disease is blood related
 Physical therapy if the disease impacts bones, joints, or muscles

Traditional treatment options include immunosuppressant drugs to reduce the immune response against the body's own tissues, such as:
 Non-steroidal anti-inflammatory drugs (NSAIDs) to reduce inflammation
 Glucocorticoids to reduce inflammation
 Disease-modifying anti-rheumatic drugs (DMARDs) to decrease the damaging tissue and organ effects of the inflammatory autoimmune response

Because immunosuppressants weaken the overall immune response, relief of symptoms must be balanced with preserving the patient's ability to combat infections, which could potentially be life-threatening. 

Non-traditional treatments are being researched, developed, and used, especially when traditional treatments fail. These methods aim to either block the activation of pathogenic cells in the body, or alter the pathway that suppresses these cells naturally. These treatments aim to be less toxic to the patient and have more specific targets. Such options include:
 Monoclonal antibodies that can be used to block pro-inflammatory cytokines
 Antigen-specific immunotherapy which allows immune cells to specifically target the abnormal cells that cause autoimmune disease
 Co-stimulatory blockade that works to block the pathway that leads to the autoimmune response
 Regulatory T cell therapy that utilizes this special type of T cell to suppress the autoimmune response

Epidemiology 
The first estimate of US prevalence for autoimmune diseases as a group was published in 1997 by Jacobson, et al. They reported US prevalence to be around 9 million, applying prevalence estimates for 24 diseases to a US population of 279 million. Jacobson's work was updated by Hayter & Cook in 2012. This study used Witebsky's postulates, as revised by Rose & Bona, to extend the list to 81 diseases and estimated overall cumulative US prevalence for the 81 autoimmune diseases at 5.0%, with 3.0% for males and 7.1% for females. The estimated community prevalence, which takes into account the observation that many people have more than one autoimmune disease, was 4.5% overall, with 2.7% for males and 6.4% for females. National Health and Nutrition Examination Surveys conducted in the US from the 1980s to present day, have shown an increase of antinuclear antibodies, a common biomarker for autoimmune diseases. This shows that there has been an increase in the prevalence of autoimmune diseases in recent years pointing to a stronger influence of environment factors as a risk factor for autoimmune diseases.

Research
In both autoimmune and inflammatory diseases, the condition arises through aberrant reactions of the human adaptive or innate immune systems. In autoimmunity, the patient's immune system is activated against the body's own proteins. In chronic inflammatory diseases, neutrophils and other leukocytes are constitutively recruited by cytokines and chemokines, resulting in tissue damage.

Mitigation of inflammation by activation of anti-inflammatory genes and the suppression of inflammatory genes in immune cells is a promising therapeutic approach. There is a body of evidence that once the production of autoantibodies has been initialized, autoantibodies have the capacity to maintain their own production.

Stem-cell therapy 

Stem cell transplantation is being studied and has shown promising results in certain cases.

Medical trials to replace the pancreatic β cells that are destroyed in type 1 diabetes are in progress.

Altered glycan theory 

According to this theory, the effector function of the immune response is mediated by the glycans (polysaccharides) displayed by the cells and humoral components of the immune system. Individuals with autoimmunity have alterations in their glycosylation profile such that a proinflammatory immune response is favored. It is further hypothesized that individual autoimmune diseases will have unique glycan signatures.

Hygiene hypothesis 
According to the hygiene hypothesis, high levels of cleanliness expose children to fewer antigens than in the past, causing their immune systems to become overactive and more likely to misidentify own tissues as foreign, resulting in autoimmune or allergic conditions such as asthma.

Vitamin D influence on immune response 
Vitamin D is known as an immune regulator that assists in the adaptive and innate immune response. A deficiency in vitamin D, from hereditary or environmental influence, can lead to a more inefficient and weaker immune response and seen as a contributing factor to the development of autoimmune diseases. With vitamin D present, vitamin D response elements (VDRE) are encoded and expressed via pattern recognition receptors (PRR) responses and the genes associated with those responses. The specific DNA target sequence expressed is known as 1,25-(OH)2D3. The expression of 1,25-(OH)2D3 can be induced by macrophages, dendritic cells, T-cells, and B-cells. In the presence of 1,25-(OH)2D3, the immune system's production of inflammatory cytokines are suppressed and more tolerogenic regulatory T-cells are expressed. This is due to vitamin D's influence on cell maturation, specifically T-cells, and their phenotype expression. Lack of 1,25-(OH)2D3 expression can lead to less tolerant regulatory T-cells, larger presentation of antigens to less tolerant T-cells, and increased inflammatory response.

See also
 List of autoimmune diseases

References

Further reading

External links 
 

 
Autoinflammatory syndromes
Medical lists
Wikipedia medicine articles ready to translate
Wikipedia neurology articles ready to translate